The Roman Catholic Metropolitan Archdiocese of Montpellier (–Lodève–Béziers–Agde–Saint-Pons-de-Thomières) (Latin: Archidioecesis Metropolitae Montis Pessulani (–Lotevensis–Biterrensis–Agathensis–Sancti Pontii Thomeriarum); French: Archidiocèse Metropolitain de Montpellier (–Lodève–Béziers–Agde–Saint-Pons-de-Thomières)) is an archdiocese of the Latin Church of the Roman Catholic Church in south-western France. It was probably created in the 3rd century AD. The current metropolitan archbishop is Pierre-Marie Carré; the immediate past Archbishop Emeritus is Guy Marie Alexandre Thomazeau. On September 16, 2002, as part of the reshuffling of the map of the French ecclesiastical provinces, the diocese of Montpellier (Lodève, Béziers, Agde, and Saint-Pons-de-Thomières) ceased to be a suffragan of Avignon and was elevated to archdiocese and metropolitan of a new ecclesiastical province, with the dioceses of Carcassonne, Mende, Nimes (Uzès and Alès) and Perpignan–Elne as suffragans.

History
When the Concordat of 1802 reestablished this diocese, it accorded to it also the département of Tarn, which was detached from it in 1822 by the creation of the Archdiocese of Albi; and from 1802 to 1822, Montpellier was a suffragan of Toulouse. A Papal Brief of 16 June 1877, authorized the bishops of Montpellier to style themselves bishops of Montpellier, Béziers, Agde, Lodève and Saint-Pons, in memory of the different dioceses united in the present diocese of Montpellier.

Maguelone was the original diocese. Local traditions, recorded in 1583 by Abbé Gariel in his Histoire des évêques de Maguelonne, affirm that St. Simon the Leper, having landed at the mouth of the Rhône with St. Lazarus and his sisters, was the earliest apostle of Maguelone. Gariel invokes in favour of this tradition a certain manuscript brought from Byzantium. But the chronicler, Bishop Arnaud de Verdale (1339–1352) was ignorant of this alleged Apostolic origin of Maguelone. It is certain that the tombstone of a Christian woman named Vera was found at Maguelone; Le Blant assigns it to the 4th century.

The first historically known Bishop of Maguelone, Boetius, assisted at the Council of Narbonne in 589. Maguelone was completely destroyed in the course of the wars between Charles Martel and the Saracens. The diocese was then transferred to Substantion, but Bishop Arnaud (1030–1060) brought it back to Maguelone which he rebuilt.

Near Maguelone had grown up by degrees the two villages of Montpellier and Montpellieret. According to legend, they were in the tenth century the property of the two sisters of St. Fulcran, Bishop of Lodève. About 975 they gave them to Ricuin, Bishop of Maguelone. It is certain that about 990 Ricuin possessed these two villages; he kept Montpellieret and gave Montpellier in fief to the family of the Guillems. In 1085 Pierre, Count of Substantion and Melgueil, became a vassal of the Holy See for this countship, and relinquished the right of nomination to the diocese of Maguelone. Urban II charged the Bishop of Maguelone to exercise the papal suzerainty, and he spent five days in this town when he came to France to preach the First Crusade. In 1215 Pope Innocent III gave the countship of Melgueil in fief to the Bishop of Maguelone, who thus became a Prince-bishop.

From that time the Bishop of Maguelone had the right of coinage. Pope Clement IV reproached (1266) Bishop Bérenger Frédol with causing to be struck in his diocese a coin called "Miliarensis", on which was rend the name of Mahomet; in fact at that date the bishop, as well as the King of Aragon and the Count of Toulouse, authorized the coinage of Arabic money, not intended for circulation in Maguelone, but to be sold for exportation to the merchants of the Mediterranean.

In July, 1204, Montpellier passed into the hands of Peter II of Aragon, son-in-law of the last of the Guillems; James I of Aragon, son of Peter II, united the city to the Kingdom of Majorca. In 1282 the King of Majorca paid homage to the King of France for Maguelone. Bérenger Frédol, Bishop of Maguelone, ceded Montpellier to Philip IV of France (1292). James III of Majorca sold Montpellier to Philip VI (1349); and the city, save for the period from 1365 to 1382, was henceforth French.

Urban V had studied theology and canon law at Montpellier and was crowned pope by Cardinal Ardouin Aubert, nephew of Innocent VI, and Bishop of Maguelone from 1352 to 1354; hence the attachment of Pope Urban for this diocese which he favoured greatly. In 1364 he founded at Montpellier of a Benedictine monastery under the patronage of St. Germain, and came himself to Montpellier to see the new church (9 January - 8 March 1367). He caused the city to be surrounded by ramparts, in order that the scholars might work there in safety; and finally he caused a large canal to be begun by which Montpellier might communicate with the sea.

At the request of King Francis I, who pleaded the epidemics and the ravages of the pirates which constantly threatened Maguelone, Pope Paul III transferred the see to Montpellier (27 March 1536). Montpellier, into which Calvinism was introduced in February, 1560, by the pastor, Guillaume Mauget, was much troubled by the wars of religion. Under Henry III of France a sort of Calvinistic republic was installed there. The city was reconquered by Louis XIII (October, 1622).

Among the 54 bishops of Maguelone, and the 18 bishops of Montpellier, may be mentioned: Blessed Louis Aleman (1418–1423), later Bishop of Arles; Guillaume Pellicier (1527–68), whom king Francis I of France sent as an ambassador to Venice, and whose leaning as a humanist and naturalist made him after Scévole de Sainte-Marthe "the most learned man of his century"; the preacher Pierre Fenouillet (1608–52); François de Bosquet (1657–76), whose historical labours were very useful to the celebrated Baluze; the bibliophile Colbert de Croissy (1696–1738), who induced the Oratorian Pouget to compose in 1702 the famous "Catechism of Montpellier", condemned by the Holy See in 1712 and 1721 for Jansenistic tendencies; Fournier (1806–34), who in 1801 was confined for a time in the madhouse at Bicêtre at the command of Napoleon I Bonaparte, for a sermon against the Revolution.

Among the numerous councils and synods held at Montpellier, the following merit mention: the council of 1162 in which Pope Alexander III excommunicated the antipope, Victor; the provincial synod of 1195, which was occupied with the Saracens of Spain and the Albigenses; the council of 1215, which was presided over by Peter of Benevento, legate of the Holy See and passed important canons concerning discipline, and declared also that subject to the approval of the pope, Toulouse and all the other towns taken from the Albigenses should be given to Simon de Montfort; the council of 1224, which rejected the request of Raymond, Count of Toulouse. who promised to protect the Catholic Faith and demanded that Amaury de Montfort withdraw his claims to the countship of Toulouse; the council of 1258, which by permitting the seneschal of Beaucaire to arrest ecclesiastics taken in the act of crime, in order to hand them over to the bishop, made way for royal magistrates to exercise a certain power within the limits of ecclesiastical jurisdiction and thus inaugurated the movement as a result of which, under the name of "privileged cases", a certain number of offences committed by ecclesiastics became amenable to lay justice.

Saints
Special honour is paid in the present diocese of Montpellier to Saint Pontius of Cimiez (Pons de Cimiez), martyr under Emperor Valerian, patron of Saint-Pons-de-Thomières; Sts. Tiberius and Modestus and St. Florence, martyrs at Agde under Diocletian; St. Severus, Abbot of St. André, at Agde (d. about 500); Saint Maxentius, a native of Agde and founder of the Abbey of St-Maixent, in Poitou (447–515); St. Benedict of Aniane, and his disciple and first historian, Saint Ardo Smaragdus (d. in 843); St. Guillem, Duke of Aquitaine, who in 804, founded near Lodève, on the advice of St. Benedict of Aniane, the monastery of Gellone (later St-Guillem du Désert), died there in 812, and under the name of "Guillaume au Court Nez" became the hero of a celebrated epic chanson; St. Etienne, Bishop of Apt (975–1046), born at Agde; Blessed Guillaume VI, Lord of Montpellier from 1121 to 1149 and who died a Cistercian at Grandselve Abbey; Peter of Castelnau, Archdeacon of Maguelone, inquisitor (d. in 1208); Gérard de Lunel (St. Gerard), Lord of Lunel (end of thirteenth century); the celebrated pilgrim, St. Roch, who was born at Montpellier about the end of the thirteenth century, saved several cities of Italy from the pest, and returned to Montpellier to live as a hermit, where he died in 1325.

Bishops of Maguelone

Boèce (Boecio/Boetius) 589
Geniès (Genesio/Genesius, Ginesius) 597–633?
Gumild 672 oder 673
Vincent 683
Johann MagueloneJohann I. 791
Ricuin I. 812–817
Argemire 818 or 819
Stabellus 821–823
Maldomer 867
Abbo 875–897
Gontier 906–909
Pons 937–947
Ricuin II. 975
Peter I. de Melgueil 988–1030 or 1004–1019
Arnaud I. 1030–1060
Bertrand I. 1060 or 1061–1079 or 1080
Godefroi (Geoffroi) 1080–1104
Walter von Lille 1104–1129
Raimond I. 1129–1158
Jean de Montlaur 1158–1190
Guillaume de Raimond 1190–1195
Guillaume de Fleix 1195–1202
Guillaume D`Autignac (Antignac) 1203 or 1204–1216
Bernard de Mèze 1216–1230 or 1232
Jean de Montlaur II 1232–1247
Reinier Saccoin 1247–1249
Pierre de Conques 1248–1256
Guillaume Christophe 1256–1263
Bérenger Frédol 1263–1296
Gaucelin de La Garde 1296–1304 or 1305
Pierre de Lévis de Mirepoix 1305 or 1306–1309
Jean Raimond de Comminges 1309–1317
Gaillard Saumate 1317–1318
André de Frédol 1318–1328
Jean de Vissec 1328–1334
Pictavin de Montesquiou 1334–1339
Arnaud de Verdale 1339–1352
Aldouin Alberti 1352–1353
Durand de Chapelles 1353–1361
Pierre de Canillac 1361
Dieudonné de Canillac 1361–1367
Gaucelin de Déaux (Dreux) 1367–1373
Pierre de Vernols 1373–1389
Antoine de Lovier 1389–1405
Pierre Adhémar 1405 or 1408–1415
Louis Allemand 1418–1423
Guillaume Forestier 1423–1429
Léger Saporis D'Eyragues 1429–1430
Bertrand Robert 1431–1433
Robert de Rouvres 1433–1453
Maur de Valleville 1453–1471
Jean Bonald 1471 oder 1472–1487
Guillaume Le Roy de Chavigny 1487–1488
Izarn Barrière 1487 or 1488–1498
Guillaume Pellicier 1498–1527 or 1529

Bishops of Montpellier

Guillaume Pellicier II 1527 or 1529–1568 (of Montpellier from 1535)
Antoine de Subjet de Cardot 1573–1596
Guitard de Ratte 1596–1602
Jean Garnier 1603–1607
Pierre Fenolliet (Fenouillet) 1607–1652
Rinaldo d'Este 1653–1655 (Cardinal)
François Bosquet 1655–1676
Charles de Pradel 1676–1696
Charles-Joachim Colbert de Croissy 1696–1738
Georges-Lazare Berger de Charency 1738–1748
François Renaud de Villeneuve 1748–1766
Raymond de Durfort Léobard 1766–1774
Joseph-François de Malide 1774–1790
Dominique Pouderous 1791–?
Alexandre Victor Rouanet
Jean-Louis-Simon Rollet 1802–1806
Nicolas Marie Fournier de La Contamine 1806–1834
Charles-Thomas Thibault 1835–1861
François-Marie-Joseph Lecourtier 1861–1873
François de Rovérié de Cabrières 1873–1921 (Cardinal from 1911)
René-Pierre Mignen 1922–1931 (also Archbishop of Rennes)
Gabriel Brunhes 1932–1949
Jean Duperray 1949–1957
Cyprien-Louis-Pierre-Clément Tourel 1958–1976
Louis-Antoine-Marie Boffet 1976–1996
Jean-Pierre Ricard 1996–2001, appointed Archbishop of Bordeaux)

Archbishops
Guy Marie Alexandre Thomazeau (2002–2011)
Pierre-Marie Carré (2011–2022)
Norbert Turini (2022–present)

See also
Catholic Church in France
List of Catholic dioceses in France
Maguelone Cathedral

References

Bibliography

Sources

  Centre national des Archives de l'Église de France, L’Épiscopat francais depuis 1919, retrieved: 2016-12-24.

Montpellier
Roman Catholic dioceses in France
Dioceses established in the 3rd century
 
3rd-century establishments in Roman Gaul